Tiegem (also, Tieghem) is a village in the municipality of Anzegem, near Oudenaarde, West Flanders, Belgium. Tiegem was birthplace of St. Arnold of Soissons.

References

Populated places in West Flanders
Anzegem